During 1972–73 season Juventus competed in Serie A, Coppa Italia and European Cup.

Summary 
Cestmir Vycpalek added 30-yrs-old goalkeeper Dino Zoff and veteran forward José Altafini from S.S.C. Napoli to the team seeking to retain the league and the European Cup.

The team won the league, however lost the finals of European Cup against Johan Cruijff's Ajax and Coppa Italia.

Squad 

(captain)

Competitions

Serie A

League table

Matches

Coppa Italia

First round

Second round

Final

European Cup

First round

Second round

Quarter-finals

Semi-finals

Final

Statistics

Goalscorers 
 

13 goals
 Pietro Anastasi
 Franco Causio

12 goals
  José Altafini

11 goals
 Roberto Bettega

5 goals
 Fabio Capello
 Helmut Haller

3 goals
 Gianpietro Marchetti

2 goals
 Antonello Cuccureddu
 Sandro Salvadore

1 goal
 Giuseppe Furino
 Silvio Longobucco
 Domenico Maggiora
 Gianluigi Savoldi

References 

 
 
 
 l'Unità, 1972 and 1973.
 La Stampa, 1972 and 1973.

External links 
 
 
 

Juventus F.C. seasons
Juventus
Italian football championship-winning seasons